Volleyball at the 2011 Pacific Games was held from August 29–September 9, 2011 at several venues.

Events

Medal table

Medal summary

References
Volleyball at the 2011 Pacific Games

 
2011 Pacific Games
Pacific Games
2011